The Jockey Club is a club of Buenos Aires, Argentina. It was created by President Carlos Pellegrini on April 15, 1882, to gather the most important and prominent men of Argentina. The Jockey Club is a symbol of the oligarchy of Argentina because its membership is reserved for only a few powerful families in the country.  In 2007, the club celebrated the 125th Anniversary of the Jockey Club.

Irrespective of its name, the club is not only a jockey club but principally a place for meetings of the members. When it was created the possession of horses and countries was related to power and relations with the ruling class of Argentina.

The principal headquarters are at Avenida Alvear, one of the most exclusives of Buenos Aires.

During the presidency of Juan Domingo Perón on 15 April 1953, the then headquarters at Florida Street were destroyed by Perón's supporters, who wanted to attack the symbols of the high class of Argentina after the bombing of Plaza de Mayo.

Two historically significant golf courses, Jockey Club (Red) and Jockey Club (Blue) were designed by golf architect Alister Mackenzie in 1930.    From Mackenzie's book The Spirit of St. Andrews. Sleeping Bear Press. : 

In San Isidro, the Hipódromo de San Isidro was inaugurated on December 8, 1935.

In 1940, the construction of the golf clubhouse followed by the construction of the first two polo fields.  Ultimately, seven polo fields were built in conjunction with swimming pools, tennis courts, and soccer fields.

Golf history

World Cup (men's golf), 1962

Shell's Wonderful World of Golf, 1962

Argentine Open, multiple

Alister Mackenzie Society, 2012

References

External links
 Official site (in Spanish)

Buenos Aires
Gentlemen's clubs in Argentina